Arantxa Sánchez Vicario was the defending champion but did not compete that year.

Conchita Martínez won in the final 6–1, 6–4 against Gabriela Sabatini.

Seeds
A champion seed is indicated in bold text while text in italics indicates the round in which that seed was eliminated. The top eight seeds received a bye to the second round.

  Conchita Martínez (champion)
  Gabriela Sabatini (final)
  Magdalena Maleeva (semifinals)
  Judith Wiesner (second round)
  Amanda Coetzer (quarterfinals)
  Inés Gorrochategui (quarterfinals)
  Zina Garrison-Jackson (third round)
  Sabine Hack (semifinals)
  Irina Spîrlea (third round)
  Sandra Cecchini (second round)
  Sabine Appelmans (first round)
  Ann Grossman (first round)
  Miriam Oremans (second round)
  Larisa Savchenko (first round)
  Chanda Rubin (third round)
  Anna Smashnova (first round)

Draw

Finals

Top half

Section 1

Section 2

Bottom half

Section 3

Section 4

External links
 ITF tournament edition details

Amelia Island Championships
1995 WTA Tour